Ferdynandów  is a village in the administrative district of Gmina Adamów, within Łuków County, Lublin Voivodeship, in eastern Poland.

The village has a population of 200.

References

Ferdynandow